= Pura Jagannath =

Village in Uttar Pradesh, India

Pura Jagannath is a village in Prayagraj, Uttar Pradesh, India.
